Wetzikon–Robenhausen is one of the 111 serial sites of the UNESCO World Heritage Site Prehistoric pile dwellings around the Alps, of which are 56 located in Switzerland. The site is located on Pfäffikersee lakeshore in Robenhausen, a locality of the municipality of Wetzikon in the Canton of Zürich in Switzerland.

Geography 
The site is located on Pfäffikersee lake shore in Robenhausen, a locality of the municipality of Wetzikon in the Canton of Zürich in Switzerland.

Description 
The area at the southern end of the Pfäffikersee lake shore has been inhabited for over 10,000 years. Neolithic hunters and collectors built during the European Mesolithic at various locations storage bins, and in the Neolithic period several small, permanently inhabited settlements near the shore. 

The settlement site is characterized by the excellent preservation of organic remains and evidence of textile production, including textiles and parts of a Neolithic loom. A rare find is a board which was probably a door, attributed to the Pfyn culture. The age of a dugout found in 1943 is not yet released. Back to the middle-European Bronze Age era date numerous individual finds, among them two trailers. Further excavations at Tösstalstrasse provided evidence of a settlement of the Glockenbecher culture. Except for individual finds and Jakob Messikommer's excavations to the 1900s, the vast protected area is not yet explored in its entire extent.

Archaeological excavations 

The remains of the Neolithic settlements in the protected marsh area were discovered by Jakob Messikommer between 1856 and 1858. On occasion of several excavations Messikommer reported the discovery of a dugout of a peculiar form and other artefacts of the equipment of a hunter; he also distinguished two of a peat layer separate segmented layers which Messikommer interpreted as a settlement that was rebuilt, and in fact he was right. Additional individual finds included longbows, hatchets made of stone and stag horn, and ceramics. Messikommer identified, among the organic finds, however 58 different animal species. In another of his excavations Messikommer revealed the remains of woven fabrics, braids and seeds and evidence of the production of butter. Carved wooden knife, a trowel and scoops, a yoke of hazel, flail, remains of a garment and one from raffia braided mat were other single finds. Jakob Messikommer's achievements were honored with a memorial stone and the so-called Messikomer Eich, an oak in the Robenhausen reed.

Protection 

As well as being part of the 56 Swiss sites of the UNESCO World Heritage Site Prehistoric pile dwellings around the Alps, the settlement is also listed in the Swiss inventory of cultural property of national and regional significance as a Class A object of national importance. Hence, the area is provided as a historical site under federal protection, within the meaning of the Swiss Federal Act on the nature and cultural heritage (German: Bundesgesetz über den Natur- und Heimatschutz NHG) of 1 July 1966. Unauthorised researching and purposeful gathering of findings represent a criminal offense according to Art. 24.

See also 
 Prehistoric pile dwellings around Zürichsee

Literature 
 Peter J. Suter, Helmut Schlichtherle et al.: Pfahlbauten – Palafittes – Palafitte. Palafittes, Biel 2009. .
 Pfahlbaufieber. Von Antiquaren, Pfahlbaufischern, Altertümerhändlern und Pfahlbaumythen. Mitteilungen der Antiquarischen Gesellschaft in Zürich, volume 71. Chronos, Zürich 2004.

References

External links 

 
 Stadt Zürich Unterwasserarchäologie 

Prehistoric pile dwellings in Switzerland
Wetzikon
Pfäffikersee
Cultural property of national significance in the canton of Zürich
World Heritage Sites in Switzerland
Archaeological sites in Switzerland
Stilt houses